Unternberg is a mountain of Bavaria, Germany.

Mountains of Bavaria
Chiemgau Alps
Mountains of the Alps